The 1951 Major League Baseball season opened on April 16 and finished on October 12, 1951. Teams from both leagues played a 154-game regular season schedule.  At the end of the regular season, the National League pennant was still undecided resulting in a three game playoff between the New York Giants and the Brooklyn Dodgers.  After splitting the first two games, the stage was set for a decisive third game, won in dramatic fashion on a walk-off home run from the bat of Giant Bobby Thomson, one of the most famous moments in the history of baseball, commemorated as the "Shot Heard 'Round the World" and "The Miracle at Coogan's Bluff".  The Giants lost the World Series to defending champion New York Yankees, who were in the midst of a 5-year World Series winning streak.

Awards and honors
Baseball Hall of Fame
Mel Ott
Jimmie Foxx
MLB Most Valuable Player Award
 Yogi Berra, New York Yankees, C
 Roy Campanella, Brooklyn Dodgers, C
MLB Rookie of the Year Award
Gil McDougald, New York Yankees, 3B
Willie Mays, New York Giants, OF
The Sporting News Player of the Year Award
Stan Musial St. Louis Cardinals
The Sporting News Manager of the Year Award
Leo Durocher New York Giants

Statistical leaders

Standings

American League

National League

  The New York Giants defeated the Brooklyn Dodgers in best-of-three playoff series to earn the National League pennant.

Postseason

Bracket

Managers

American League

National League

Home Field Attendance

Events
May 1 – Umpire Frank Dascoli banishes all 11 players on the Chicago Cubs bench during the fourth inning of the game against the New York Giants, after the Cubs players allegedly call Dascoli "Rabbit Ears". Bill Serena and Smoky Burgess are later allowed to return to the game to pinch hit for the Cubs.
May 15 – At Fenway Park, the Boston Red Sox  celebrated the franchise's 50th anniversary and honored members of the 1901 Boston Americans. Overall, 29 old-timers who played, managed, or umpired in the American League in that first year attended, including Bill Bradley, Tom Connolly, Wid Conroy, Hugh Duffy, Clark Griffith, Dummy Hoy, Connie Mack, Ollie Pickering, Billy Sullivan and Cy Young. Eight of them participated in the first-ever game of the American League, played in Chicago on April 24, 1901. The regular game that followed the ceremony featured the 300th career home run of Ted Williams in the 4th inning off Chicago White Sox pitcher Howie Judson. With the game tied at 7–7 in the top of the 11th inning, Nellie Fox hit the first homer of his six-year career against reliever Ray Scarborough, to give the White Sox and reliever Harry Dorish a 9–7 victory.
July 7 – The Cincinnati Reds defeat the Chicago Cubs 8–6 - every scoring half-inning featured two runs. 
September 13 –  The St. Louis Cardinals become the first team in Major League history to play two different teams on the same day. Due to a rained out game, the Cardinals are forced to play the New York Giants in an afternoon game prior to  their scheduled night game against the Boston Braves.
September 14 – Bob Nieman of the St. Louis Browns becomes the first player to hit two home runs in his first two at-bats.
October 1–3 – The Giants and Dodgers meet in a special three-game playoff to decide the National League pennant.  Bobby Thomson's walk-off homerun at the bottom of the ninth in the third game becomes known as the "Shot Heard 'Round the World"

See also
1951 All-American Girls Professional Baseball League season
1951 Nippon Professional Baseball season

References

External links
1951 Major League Baseball season schedule at Baseball Reference

 
Major League Baseball seasons